Philoctetes ( Philoktētēs; English pronunciation: , stressed on the third syllable, -tet-), or Philocthetes, according to Greek mythology, was the son of Poeas, king of Meliboea in Thessaly, and Demonassa or Methone. He was a Greek hero, famed as an archer, and a participant in the Trojan War.

Philoctetes was the subject of four different plays of ancient Greece, each written by one of the three major Greek tragedians. Of the four plays, Sophocles' Philoctetes is the only one that has survived. Sophocles' Philoctetes at Troy, Aeschylus' Philoctetes and Euripides' Philoctetes have all been lost, with the exception of some fragments. Philoctetes is also mentioned in Homer's Iliad, Book 2, which describes his exile on the island of Lemnos, his being wounded by snake-bite, and his eventual recall by the Greeks. The recall of Philoctetes is told in the lost epic Little Iliad, where his retrieval was accomplished by Diomedes.  Philoctetes killed three men at Troy.

Description 
Philoctetes was described by the chronicler Malalas in his account of the Chronography as "a good height, well set, dark skinned, eyebrows meeting, brave, good eyes, good nose, black hair, hairy, sensible, accurate archer, magnanimous".

The stories

Philoctetes was the son of King Poeas of the city of Meliboea in Thessaly.  Heracles wore the shirt of Nessus and built his own funeral pyre. No one would light it for him except for Philoctetes, or in other versions his father Poeas. This gained him the favor of the newly deified Heracles. Because of this, Philoctetes or Poeas was given Heracles' bow and poisoned arrows.

Philoctetes was one of the many eligible Greeks who competed for the hand of Helen, the Spartan princess; according to legend, she was the most beautiful woman in the world. As such, he was required to participate in the conflict to reclaim her for Menelaus in the Trojan War. Philoctetes was stranded on the island of Lemnos by the Greeks on the way to Troy.  There are at least four separate tales about what happened to strand Philoctetes on his journey to Troy, but all indicate that he received a wound on his foot that festered and had a terrible smell.  One version holds that Philoctetes was bitten by a snake that Hera sent to molest him as punishment for his or his father's service to Heracles. Another tradition says that the Greeks forced Philoctetes to show them where Heracles's ashes were deposited.  Philoctetes would not break his oath by speech, so he went to the spot and placed his foot upon the site.  Immediately, he was injured in the foot that touched the soil over the ashes.  Yet another tradition has it that when the Achaeans, en route to Troy at the beginning of the war, came to the island of Tenedos, Achilles angered Apollo by killing King Tenes, allegedly the god's son.  When, in expiation, the Achaeans offered a sacrifice to Apollo, a snake came out from the altar and bit Philoctetes.  Finally, it is said that Philoctetes received his terrible wound on the island of Chryse, when he unknowingly trespassed into the shrine of the nymph after whom the island was named (this is the version in the extant play by Sophocles).  A modern interpretation of the cause of his wound is that he was scratched by a poisoned arrow. Commonly tips of arrows were poisoned with a combination of fermented viper venom, blood or plasma, and feces. Even a scratch would result in death, sometimes drawn out. A person who survives would do so with a festering wound.

Regardless of the cause of the wound, Philoctetes was exiled by the Greeks and was angry at the treatment he received from Odysseus, King of Ithaca, who had advised the Atreidae to strand him. Medôn took control of Philoctetes' men, and Philoctetes himself remained on Lemnos, alone, for ten years.

Helenus, the prophetic son of King Priam of Troy, was forced to reveal, under torture, that one of the conditions of the Greeks' winning the war was that they needed the bow and arrows of Heracles.  Upon hearing this, Odysseus and a group of men (usually including Diomedes) rushed back to Lemnos to recover Heracles' weapons.  (As Sophocles writes it in his play titled Philoctetes, Odysseus is accompanied by Neoptolemus, Achilles' son, also known as Pyrrhus. Other versions of the myth don't include Neoptolemus.)  Surprised to find the archer alive, the Greeks balked on what to do next. Odysseus tricked the weaponry away from Philoctetes, but Diomedes refused to take the weapons without the man. 
Heracles, who had become a god many years earlier, came down from Olympus and told Philoctetes to go and that he would be healed by the son of Asclepius and win great honor as a hero of the Achaean army. Once back in military company outside Troy, they employed either Machaon the surgeon (who may have been killed by Eurypylus of Mysia, son of Telephus, depending on the account) or more likely Podalirius the physician, both sons of the immortal physician Asclepius, to heal his wound permanently. Philoctetes challenged and would have killed Paris, son of Priam, in single combat were it not for the debates over future Greek strategy. In one telling it was Philoctetes who killed Paris. He shot four times: the first arrow went wide; the second struck his bow hand; the third hit him in the right eye; the fourth hit him in the heel, so there was no need of a fifth shot. Philoctetes sided with Neoptolemus about continuing to try to storm the city. They were the only two to think so because they had not had the war-weariness of the prior ten years. Afterward, Philoctetes was among those chosen to hide inside the Trojan Horse, and during the sack of the city he killed many famed Trojans.

According to another myth, the Pylius (Πύλιος), the son of god Hephaestus, healed Philoctetes at Lemnos.

Cult and cities
The author of the Aristotelian Corpus writes that Philoctetes lived at the Macalla after he returned from the Trojan War, and adds that the hero had deposited there in the temple of Apollo Halius the bow and arrows of Hercules, which had, however, been removed by the Crotoniats to the temple of Apollo in their own city. In addition, the author mention that Philoctetes is honored among the Sybarites.
According to Lycophron, at Macalla the inhabitants built a great shrine above his grave and glorified him as an everlasting god with libations and sacrifice of oxen.

Justin writes that people say that the city of Thurii was built by Philoctetes and his monument is seen there even to his days, as well as the arrows of Hercules which laid up in the temple of Apollo.

Solinus, Strabo and Virgil write that Petilia was established by Philoctetes.

Strabo writes that also Krimisa and Chone were established by Philoctetes. In addition, Strabo write that some of Philoctetes companions fortified Aegesta.

On a barren island near Lemnos there was an altar of Philoctetes with a brazen serpent, bows and breastplate bound with strips, to remind of the sufferings of the hero.

Modern depictions

Drama
 The legend of Philoctetes was used by André Gide in his play Philoctète.
 George Maxim Ross adapted the legend in his play Philoktetes, which was written in the 1950s and performed off Broadway at One Sheridan Square.
 The East German postmodern dramatist Heiner Müller produced a successful adaptation of Sophocles' play in 1968 in Munich. It became one of his most-performed plays.
 Philoctetes appears in Seamus Heaney's play The Cure at Troy, a "version" of Sophocles' Philoctetes.
 John Jesurun wrote the Philoktetes-variations in 1993 on Ron Vawter's request, it was the actor's last piece of work, considered his artistic testament, being performed while the actor was dying of AIDS. The play has consequently also become a metaphor for AIDS, with Philoktetes as a plagued outcast.
In August 2021, the National Theatre in London began performances of  Paradise, a new version of Philoctetes by writer, recording artist and performer Kae Tempest, with Lesley Sharp leading an all-female cast in the Olivier Theatre on a 'dramatic wasteland' set, on the same stage for which the Olivier and Tony award-winning Rae Smith designed the original production of War Horse.

Poetry
The myth of Philoctetes is the inspiration for William Wordsworth's sonnet "When Philoctetes in the Lemnian Isle," though here the thematic focus is not the Greek warrior's magical bow or gruesome injury, but his abandonment. The poem is about the companionship and solace provided by Nature when all human society has been withdrawn.
In Richard Aldington's "The Eaten Heart" (1929) the rescue of Philoctetes by Neoptolemus becomes a metaphor for the loneliness of the human soul and its release when it experiences love for another human being.
Philoctetes being retrieved by Neoptolemus is the subject of the Greek poet Yannis Ritsos' long poem "Philoctetes" (1963–1965), a monologue in which the youth Neoptolemus convinces Philoctetes to follow him back to the war that will be won by the ruse of the Trojan Horse. Disguise and seeming are the subject of the poem:
"No one will comprehend your freedom's unmarred joy 
or be frightened by it ever. The mask of action, /
which I have brought you hidden in my pack, will conceal 
your remote, transparent face. Put it on. Let's be going."
{Translated by Peter Bien)
Philoctetes appears as a character in two Michael Ondaatje poems, entitled "The Goodnight" and "Philoctetes On The Island." Both appear in his 1979 book, There's a trick with a knife I'm learning to do.
Derek Walcott's modern Caribbean epic, Omeros, includes a character named Philoctete; he receives a wound and clearly alludes to the Greek narrative.
Philoctetes is mentioned in Poem VIII of "21 Love Poems" by Adrienne Rich:
"I can see myself years back at Sunion,
hurting with an infected foot, Philoctetes
in woman's form, limping the long path,
lying on a headland over the dark sea,
looking down the red rocks to where a soundless curl
of white told me a wave had struck,
imagining the pull of that water from that height,
knowing deliberate suicide wasn't my metier,
yet all the time nursing, measuring that wound."

Laurence Lerner's poem Philoctetes is included in his collection The Man I Killed (Secker & Warburg, 1980):
"When the pain strikes, I get no warning. Waves
Totter, and overturn; and then my foot
Is foaming metal, and a tangled sound
Bursts in the air.  Salt water in my head,
The waves exploding in my foot, then nothing."

Dimitris Lyacos's The First Death is loosely based on the death of Philoctetes in its recounting of the experiences of a crippled, marooned protagonist abandoned on a desert island. 
"too you can no longer speak, you are drowning
and the familiar pain touches
outlets in the untrodden body 
now you can no longer walk – 
you crawl, there where the darkness is deeper
more tender, carcass
of a disemboweled beast
you embrace a handful of bed-ridden bones 
and drift into sleep."

Novels
 Soren Kierkegaard had this to say about Philoctetes in his 1843 novel Either/Or: In Greek tragedy a transition is found from sorrow to pain, and as an example of this I might mention Philoctetes. This, in the stricter sense, is a tragedy of suffering. But, too, a high degree of objectivity obtains here. The Greek hero rests in his fate, it is unchangeable, there is nothing farther to be said about it. This element furnishes the precise moment of sorrow in the pain. The first doubt with which pain really begins is this: why has this befallen me, why can it not be otherwise? There is, indeed, in Philoctetes a high degree of reflection, which has always seemed remarkable to me, and which essentially separates him from that immortal trilogy: there is the masterly depicting of the self-contradiction in his pain, which contains so deep a human truth, but there is still an objectivity which sustains the whole. Philoctetes’ reflection is not absorbed in itself, and it is genuinely Greek when he complains that no one knows about his pain. There is an extraordinary truth in this, and there also appears here the precise difference between his pain and the precise reflective pain which always wants to be alone with its pain, which seeks a new pain in this solitude of pain. Soren Kierkegaard, Either/or part 1, 1843 Swenson translation 1944 p. 122-123 
The legend of Philoctetes was, in part, the inspiration for Robert Silverberg's science fiction novel The Man in the Maze.
In the novel, A Division of the Spoils, the last part of The Raj Quartet by Paul Scott, filmed as the TV series The Jewel in the Crown in 1984, "Philoctetes" is used as his pen name by Hari Kumar for his articles in the Ranpur Gazette.
In Malcolm Lowry's Under the Volcano, Hugh Firmin escapes his British upbringing by enlisting as a sailor on the ship Philoctetes.
In the 1998 novel Sirena by Donna Jo Napoli, Philoctetes is included as a main character.
Mark Merlis features a version of Philoctetes in his 1998 AIDS-themed novel An Arrow's Flight.
Philoctetes makes several appearances in the 2007 French novel/collection of linked short stories La chaussure sur le toit by Vincent Delecroix. In "L'élément tragique", Philoctète is a character who has been abandoned with a weapon and a festering leg wound on the roof of Parisian apartment building; a Ulysse and a young Néoptolème are also part of the story. In another related story,"Caractère de chien", a dog narrates the story of his master, a writer so obsessed with the story of Philoctéte and overcome by the notion of abandonment that it becomes a self-fulfilling prophecy.
 In Sirena by Donna Jo Napoli, Philocetes is the main love interest of the protagonist, Sirena. She defies Hera to heal him, and they live on Lemnos for many years until he goes off to war knowing he will die.

Cinema
 A character named Philoctetes makes an appearance in the 1997 animated movie Hercules, although the character is largely based on the centaur Chiron in the original Greek mythology. In it, Philoctetes (usually referred to simply as "Phil") is a satyr and Hercules' trainer. He is voiced by Danny DeVito, and by Robert Costanzo in the follow-up TV series and the Kingdom Hearts video games.
 A character going by the name of Mary later reveals herself to be Philoctetes in the TV series Torchwood episode "Greeks Bearing Gifts". She is depicted as a bright energy entity, having entered a woman in the 1800s in Cardiff, and implied to have entered various hosts until the one called Mary.

Essays
 Sophocles' play forms the basis of an essay by Edmund Wilson, "The Wound and the Bow", in the book of the same name.

Painting
Philoctetes on the Island of Lemnos by James Barry, 1770, From A Series of Etchings by James Barry, Esq. from his Original and Justly Celebrated Paintings, in the Great Room of the Society of Arts (Image).
The Wounded Philoctetes by Nikolaj Abraham Abildgaard, 1775, now in the Statens Museum for Kunst in Copenhagen, which is also used as the front cover for the Penguin Classics edition of the novel Frankenstein by Mary Shelley. (Image).
Philoctetes on Lemnos by Jean Germain Drouais, 1788, now in the Musée des Beaux-Arts in Chartres (Image).
Dying Philoctetes by Vincenzo Baldacci, 1807, now in the Pinacoteca Comunale in Cesena (Image)

Sculpture
Wounded Philoctetes by Herman Wilhelm Bissen, now in the Ny Carlsberg Glyptotek in Copenhagen (Image).
 'Portrait of the Artist as the Young Philoctetes' by Igael Tumarkin, 1965-66 in the Israel Museum .

See also
Pythagoras (of Rhegium)

References

External links

Mythological Greek archers
Argonauts
Achaean Leaders
Thessalians in the Trojan War
People of the Trojan War
Thessalian characters in Greek mythology
Mythology of Heracles
Ancient Lemnos